Acer shihweii is a rare Asian species of maple. It has been found only in Guizhou Province in southern China.

Acer shihweii is a large tree up to 33 meters tall with rough brown bark. Leaves are non-compound, up to 15 cm wide and 8 cm across, thick and leathery, sometimes with no lobes, other times with a few shallow lobes.

References

shihweii
Plants described in 1966
Flora of Guizhou